Imre Killy (born October 20, 1942) is a Hungarian former footballer who played as a midfielder.

Career 
Killy played in the National Soccer League with Toronto Hungaria in 1963. He returned to play with Hungaria for the  1966 season. He re-signed with Toronto for the 1967 season. In 1968, he played in the North American Soccer League with Dallas Tornado where he appeared in five matches. In 1971, he featured in the International Jubilee soccer tournament with L.A. Hungarians. In the winter of 1971, he played in the Greater Los Angeles Soccer League with Condor Hungarians.   

He re-signed with Condor Hungarians for the 1972 season. He was also named to the 1972 Los Angeles All-Star team. He played his third season with Condor in 1973. He featured with the L.A. Hungarians once more in the 1973 International Jubilee soccer tournament. In 1977, he returned to the NSL to play with Mississauga Hungaria where he served as team captain.

References  
 

Living people
Association football midfielders
Hungarian footballers
Dallas Tornado players
Canadian National Soccer League players
North American Soccer League (1968–1984) players
1942 births
Footballers from Budapest